Mazraeh (also Romanized as Mazra‘eh; also known as Marz, Mazra‘, and Mezre) is a village in Rudqat Rural District, Sufian District, Shabestar County, East Azerbaijan Province, Iran. At the 2006 census, its population was 1,220, in 300 families.

References 

Populated places in Shabestar County